
Ezel may refer to:

Geography
Ezel (biblical place), a rock or cairn where David hides to avoid being killed by King Saul in 1 Samuel 20:19 
Ezel, Kentucky, a town in the United States
Ezel Island, Russian name for the Estonian island of Saaremaa

People
 Ezel (given name), Turkish given name

Arts, entertainment, and media
 Ezel (TV series), Turkish crime drama

See also
 Ezell (disambiguation)